MMK may refer to:
 M. M. Kaye, British writer
 Maalaala Mo Kaya, a drama anthology program in the Philippines
 Magnitogorsk Iron and Steel Works (Магнитогорский металлургический комбинат), one of Russia's largest steel companies
 Makkal Manadu Katchi, Regional political party in India
 Manithaneya Makkal Katchi, Regional political party by TMMK
 Mayr-Melnhof Karton, a manufacturer in the paper and packaging industry in Austria
 Mūlamadhyamakakārikā, a foundational text of the Buddhist Madhyamaka school, by Nagarjuna
 Museum für Moderne Kunst, art museum in Frankfurt, Germany
 Moscow Kremlin Museums in Moscow
 Smt. M.M.K College of Commerce & Economics, a college in Mumbai, Maharashtra, India
 FAA code for Meriden Markham Municipal Airport
 IATA code for Murmansk Airport
 Station code for Madurantakam railway station, Chengalpattu, Tami Nadu, India
 Myanmar kyat, the currency of Myanmar, by ISO 4217 code